Dupeljne is a small settlement in the hills north of Lukovica pri Domžalah in the eastern part of the Upper Carniola region of Slovenia.

Name
Dupeljne was first attested in written sources in 1348 as Tewpplach (and in 1353 as zu dem Dupelnik). The old transcriptions are based on a locative plural form, probably based on the plural demonym *Dupljane. The name is derived from the Slovene common noun dupel 'hollow', referring to a local geographical feature.

History
Dupeljne was mentioned in Johann Weikhard von Valvasor's 17th-century work The Glory of the Duchy of Carniola. He described the local people as speaking a slow dialect and being deliberate thinkers. During the Second World War, locals from Dupeljne helped care for wounded Partisan soldiers and supplied the Partisans' Triglav Hospital (a.k.a. Luk Hospital) near Kolovec. On 13 December 1942, German forces attacked a detachment of Partisans from Kamnik between Kolovec and Dupeljne, who then withdrew to Dupeljne.

Notable people
Notable people that were born or lived in Dupeljne include:
Jakob Grčar (1889–1966), journalist and singer

References

External links

Dupeljne on Geopedia

Populated places in the Municipality of Lukovica